Elkland School Gymnasium is a historic gym located at Todd, Ashe County, North Carolina.  It was built in 1934 by the N.C. Emergency Relief Administration, and consists of a 1 1/2-story, gable-roof center section with a one-story, gable-roofed entrance pavilion. The interior features exposed system of elegant scissor trusses that support the roof structure.

It was listed on the National Register of Historic Places in 2004.

References

School buildings on the National Register of Historic Places in North Carolina
School buildings completed in 1934
Buildings and structures in Ashe County, North Carolina
National Register of Historic Places in Ashe County, North Carolina
1934 establishments in North Carolina